The SS Monte Carlo was a concrete ship launched in 1921 as the oil tanker SS Old North State. She was later renamed McKittrick. In 1932 she became a gambling and prostitution ship operating in international waters off the coast of Long Beach, California, United States, and was relocated to  Coronado, California in 1936. The Monte Carlo was grounded on Coronado Island on New Year's Day 1937 during a storm and her wreck remains on the beach.

History 
To reduce the utilization of steel during World War I, on April 12, 1918, President Woodrow Wilson approved the construction of concrete ships, overseen by the Emergency Fleet Corporation (EFC). In total, 24 ships were approved for construction. Only 12 ships were completed by the 1918 armistice. Although the remaining unbuilt ships were cancelled, a 13th and final ship was under construction at the Newport Shipbuilding Company yard in Wilmington, North Carolina. Known as the Old North State this vessel was the third Design No. 1070 class concrete oil tanker constructed, after the previously completed  Sapona and Cape Fear. Author Norman Lang McKellar believed construction was completed in 1921 under the temporary name of Tanker No. 1, probably heavily modified from its original EFC design. Tanker No. 1 was used by the U.S. Quartermaster Corps until 1923, when the vessel was purchased by the Associated Oil Company of San Francisco and re-purposed as the commercial oil tanker McKittrick. McKittrick was powered by a single Nordberg triple expansion steam engine which was the same unit for other EFC concrete vessels.

In 1932, McKittrick was sold to Ed V. Turner and Marvin Schouweiler and renamed Monte Carlo. Her hull was mostly filled with concrete to reduce motion and the former oil tanker was converted for the purpose of gambling, prostitution and drinking, all of which were illegal during Prohibition. Under the operation of Anthony Cornero, she became the largest gambling ship operating off the California coast. Monte Carlo opened for business off Long Beach on May 7, 1932 coinciding with the 1932 Los Angeles Olympics along with two other gambling ships of the fleet. Monte Carlo was moved to international waters off Coronado Island in 1936. California law enforcement was unable to shut down the ship's operations as she was just beyond their jurisdiction. The water taxis and ferries that carried customers to and from Monte Carlo were subject to high taxation in an attempt to undermine the financial viability of the business.

Grounding 
In 1937, Monte Carlo was anchored  in international waters off Coronado Beach in San Diego during a storm on New Year's Day when the anchor lost its hold.  The ship drifted onto the beach in front of what is now the El Camino Tower of the Coronado Shores condos. Because this vessel was illegal once on shore, no one claimed ownership. The wreckage can be seen underwater at low tide, and is occasionally exposed during strong storm tides. The surrounding beach where she came to rest was coined locally as "Shipwreck Beach" by a Coronado writer and historian in 2005.

It is speculated that there may be $150,000 worth of silver dollar coins remaining in the wreckage. According to the late  lifetime resident of Coronado, Edward "Bud" Bernhard who retrieved hundreds of dollars from the shipwreck as a child: "I’m convinced there is $100,000 in gold and silver coins deep in that wreck".

From time to time the wreck becomes visible on the shore of the Silver Strand.

See also 
 SS Sapona
 SS Palo Alto

References

External links 
SS Monte Carlo at Shipwreck World

....web article preserved at -->

Shipwrecks of the California coast
SS Monte Carlo
Gambling ships
Oil tankers
Concrete ships
1921 ships
Ships built in Wilmington, North Carolina
SS Monte Carlo
Maritime incidents in 1937
SS Monte Carlo
Design 1070 ships